Sifangtai District is a district of the city of Shuangyashan, Heilongjiang province, China.

Administrative divisions 
Sifangtai District is divided into 4 subdistricts and 1 township. 
4 subdistricts
 Zhenxingzhonglu, Zhenxingdonglu, Jixian, Dongrong
1 town
 Taibao

Notes and references 

Sifangtai
Shuangyashan